Bhagwanpur is a town in the Bhagwanpur block of Vaishali district in Bihar, India.

Demographics
As of the 2011 Census of India, Bhagwanpur had a population of 2508. Males constituted 53% of the population and females 47%. Bhagwanpur had an average literacy rate of 83.56%, higher than the national average of 59.5%; with male literacy at 87.41% and female literacy of 79.22%. There were a total of 516 households.

Schools 
There is a secondary school, Shri Lakshmi Narayan Saraswati Vidya Mandir, and two colleges, Lakshmi Narayan College and Patna Sahib College of Engineering & Technology, located in Bhagwanpur.

Shri Lakshmi Narayan Saraswati Vidya Mandir 
Shri Lakshmi Narayan Saraswati Vidya Mandir is an independent, co-educational school that is affiliated to the Central Board of Secondary Education. It was established in 1998. A total of 543 students, spread across 9 classes, attend the school. There are 21 trained teaching staff, including a librarian, vice principal, and physical education teacher, present at the school.

Lakshmi Narayan College
Lakshmi Narayan College is a NAAC-ranked "B" grade school. It was established in 1975. Currently, a team of 8 teaching and 21 non-teaching staff support over 2500 men and women studying in a range of subjects, including political science, physics, botany, and education.

Patna Sahib College of Engineering & Technology

Transportation
NH-77 passes through the town. There is also a railroad station.

Railroad station 
A railway station is located in the middle of Bhagwanpur. Bhagwanpur railway station has two platforms, with a footbridge over the railroad tracks connecting them together. Many express trains stop at the station.

References

External links 
Video of the Bhagwanpur Railway Station

Vaishali district